OUH may refer to:

Odense University Hospital, in Southern Denmark
Oulu University Hospital, in Oulu, Finland
 IATA code for Oudtshoorn Airport in Oudtshoorn, South Africa